The Cheshire Police and Crime Commissioner is the police and crime commissioner, an elected official tasked with setting out the way crime is tackled by Cheshire Police in the English County of Cheshire. The post was created in November 2012, following an election held on 15 November 2012, and replaced the Cheshire Police Authority. The current incumbent is John Dwyer, who represents the Conservative Party.

List of Cheshire Police and Crime Commissioners

References

External links

Police and crime commissioners in England